Sir Arthur William Buller (5 September 1808 – 30 April 1869) was a British Liberal Party Member of Parliament, who in his early career served as head of a commission of inquiry into education reform in Lower Canada.

Background and education
Buller was born in Calcutta into a prominent Cornish family, the son of Charles Buller (1774–1848), MP for West Looe, and Barbara Isabella Kirkpatrick, daughter of General William Kirkpatrick. His elder brother was MP Charles Buller. He was educated at the University of Edinburgh and Trinity College, Cambridge, taking his MA in 1834, the same year he was called to the bar at Lincoln's Inn.

Career
From 22 August – 2 November 1838, he served as a member of the Special Council that administered Lower Canada following the Lower Canada Rebellion. Buller also prepared a report that made recommendations on further directions for education in the province. Although many of his suggestions were implemented, two key elements of the report, encouraging the use of English over the French language and an emphasis on generic Christian rather than Roman Catholic religious education, were met with strong opposition.

After he left North America, Buller was crown attorney in Ceylon from 1840 to 1848. He was afterwards a judge of the Supreme Court of Calcutta in India from 1848 to 1858.

He was Member of Parliament for Devonport from 1859 to 1865, and for Liskeard from 1865 until his death in 1869.

References

External links 

 
 

1808 births
1869 deaths
Liberal Party (UK) MPs for English constituencies
Members of the Parliament of the United Kingdom for Liskeard
UK MPs 1859–1865
UK MPs 1865–1868
UK MPs 1868–1874
Burials at Kensal Green Cemetery
Members of the Special Council of Lower Canada
Alumni of Trinity College, Cambridge
Attorneys General of British Ceylon
British India judges
Arthur William